Transgender and non-binary people in New Zealand face discrimination in several aspects of their lives. The law is unclear on the legal status of discrimination based on gender identity, and also for intersex people.

The International Commission of Jurists and the International Service for Human Rights in 2007 created the Yogyakarta Principles to apply international human rights law to gender identity and sexual orientation. The first and arguably most important is that human rights are available to all humans, regardless of gender identity, and that states should amend legislation "to ensure its consistency with the universal enjoyment of all human rights." This report suggested that transgender people were "one of the most marginalised groups" in New Zealand, leading the Human Rights Commission to publish a comprehensive inquiry entitled To Be Who I Am in 2008, which outlined some of the concerns listed below.  Transgender rights organisations carry out over 1,300 individual peer supports each year, with many of these addressing breaches of universal human rights. These concerns are particularly important considering that the discrimination and exclusion has been shown to increase the risk of mental health issues and suicide.

Currently, the Human Rights Act 1993 does not explicitly prohibit discrimination on the basis of gender. Whilst it is believed that gender identity is protected under the laws preventing discrimination on the basis of either sex or sexual orientation, it is not known how this applies to those who have not had, or will not have, gender reassignment surgery.  Some overseas courts have determined that transgender people are covered by prohibitions on discrimination based on sex, but there is also international case law suggesting it is not.  Even if it is, it is unlikely to apply to transgender people who have not or will not have gender reassignment surgery. Likewise, placing gender identity under the prohibitions on the grounds of sexual orientation is problematic. While there is some inconsistent international case law, it has been noted that gender identification and sexual orientation are too unrelated for this to be suitable.

Gender reassignment surgery is available in New Zealand, though there are cost barriers to accessing such surgery. New Zealanders are legally permitted to apply to change the designation of their gender on government documents through the Family Court if they have had medical treatment. The legalisation of same-sex marriage in 2013 had the effect of removing the requirement to divorce if one was already married.

Demographics 
According to Statistics New Zealand using data from the 2021 Household Economic Survey, there are approximately 19,400 transgender and non-binary adults (18 and over) in New Zealand. Approximately 5,500 of these identify as male, 5,400 as female, and 8,500 as another gender. The Auckland region had the largest transgender and non-binary population at 6,900, followed by the Wellington region (3,300), Canterbury (2,900), and Waikato (1,200).

New Zealand's transgender and non-binary population is younger compared to the cisgender population. Just under half (47.2%) of the transgender and non-binary population is aged under 35, compared to 30.8% of the cisgender population. In terms of ethnicity, 72.7% of the transgender and non-binary population are European (compared to 69.3%), 14.6% are Māori (14.0%), 6.7% are Pacific peoples (6.7%) and 16.9% are Asian (16.2%) (totals add to more than 100% since people may identify with multiple ethnicities).

Around 23.9% of transgender and non-binary people people had a bachelor or higher degree (compared to 26.5% of the cisgender population), and 14.7% had no formal qualifications (compared to 18.8%). Around 5.0% of transgender and non-binary people are unemployed, 63.3% are employed, and 29.5% are not in the labour force (compared to 3.0%, 65.6% and 28.0% respectively for the cisgender population). The transgender and non-binary population had an average annual disposable income of NZ$28,475, compared to $42,628 for the cisgender population. After adjusting for age, the average annual disposable income is $32,172 for the transgender and non-binary population, compared to $42,611 for the cisgender population.

Cultural discrimination 
Discrimination on the basis of gender identity can also be cultural discrimination, as in New Zealand, several cultures have a history of differences in gender identity. Cultures which accept transgender people can create positive environments for its members to determine their own gender identity. Transgender people from these communities may be aware of the potential to transition earlier, and may be less likely to require or desire genital surgery. However, there are also general concerns that Māori patients have reduced health access and receive fewer referrals and medical tests.

Discrimination in the workplace 
Discrimination in the workplace particularly relates to access to employment, job retention and safety in the workplace.   An inability to find a job can cause difficulties with having enough money, but also can cause a person to feel disconnected from the world.  Transgender people have reported harassment, violations of privacy, and unfair dismissals at the workplace.

In light of the findings of the Human Rights Commission, the Department of Labour has issued a guide to transgender people in the workplace. It specifies that unless gender identity affects the ability to perform a job, employers or prospective employers are not permitted to ask if a person is transgender. Discrimination in the workplace on the basis of gender identity can be referred to the Human Rights Commission.

The right to healthcare, and protection from discrimination on basis of health 
The health issues faced by transgender and non-binary people are particularly complex. Many general practitioners in New Zealand are unaware of medical issues and practices for transgender people, which is problematic when GPs are required to refer their patient on to specialist services.  Indeed, it is difficult to have a set practice for transgender and non-binary people because their needs and wants can be highly individualised, particularly in relation to cultural considerations and as gender identities can vary greatly from simply "male" or "female".

Currently, the Human Rights Act 1993 prohibits discrimination on the basis of disability, including psychological abnormality.  However, the Human Rights Commission Action Plan of 2004 noted that associating gender identity with "abnormality" can have a negative impact on the lives of those affected.  Whilst the medical community accepts transgender identification as a medical issue, there is concern with it being depicted as an illness.  Currently a diagnosis of Gender Identity Disorder is often required before further treatment or referrals can be given.  The World Professional Association for Transgender Health have stated that gender identification is very broad and crosses cultures and should not be considered as an illness, particularly as this can lead to stigma which can lead to mental health issues in those with different gender identities.   Whilst gender dysphoria may be severe enough in some cases to justify a mental health diagnosis, there is concern that this diagnosis is used as "a license for the stigmatization or for the deprivation of civil and human rights."

The cost of healthcare can be a significant barrier. Input from a mental health professional may be required for further treatment but not funded, limiting the service to those who can afford it. Four types of hormone treatments are subsidised through Pharmac, including puberty blockers, oestrogen, androgen blockers and testosterone. Currently, psychological input or counselling may be required to ensure fully informed consent, as some treatments are not fully reversible.

The average cost of genital reconstruction surgery in New Zealand is $53,400 for male-to-female surgeries and $218,900 for female-to-male surgeries. Furthermore, there is only one genital reconstruction surgeon in New Zealand. The Ministry of Health provides for around 14 publicly funded genital reconstruction surgeries every year. Only five surgeries were performed in 2020, primarily due to the COVID-19 pandemic cancelling elective surgeries; nine surgeries were performed in the first ten months of 2021. As of October 2021, there is a waiting list of 308 people for publicly funded surgery, meaning the wait could be substantial.  Transgender people are forced to wait or pay for private surgery.

The barriers to health access which affect transgender people have been shown to be higher for children and teenagers, because many of the specialists cater only to adults.

Gender identity and youth 
Many of the transgender people who assisted with the To Be Who I Am inquiry reported that they knew from a young age that they had a different gender identity.  A culture of stereotypes and negative beliefs about transgender people can lead to severe social difficulties for children exploring their gender.  Some trans people in New Zealand have reported both physical and sexual abuse from their parents.

Transgender status in New Zealand can currently impact on a child's right to an education. Failure to recognise when a child legally changes gender, being forced to use the wrong toilets, and bullying are problems. Youth 19 research report showed transgender students were five times as likely to be bullied on a weekly basis than their cisgender counterparts. Some transgender children have been forced to leave schools, or find there is no school that will accept them.   Bullying is a significant problem for transgender students, reported as being almost 5 times higher than that experienced by non-transgender students.  Problems like being assigned a uniform for a gender a child doesn't identify with, pressure from the school to wear it, and being forced to wear that uniform as a punishment have been reported to the Human Rights Commission.

In 2012 a health survey was undertaken of 8,500 New Zealand secondary school students, and discovered that approximately 4% were either transgender or unsure about their gender. 40% of those students who identified as transgender indicated significant depressive symptoms and one in five had attempted suicide in the last year.

Civil and political rights 

Legally changing names and sex / gender identity on official documentation can be a large barrier to transgender people in New Zealand depending on the type of document. Documents such as passports and birth certificates, changing names at schools and universities has often been difficult in the past, and could cause problems for transgender people in the future when their academic record and degree is issued in another name, but changes have been made in the recent years to ease such barriers. Counting Ourselves (2019) report showed over 80% of transgender people in New Zealand had an incorrect gender marker on their birth certificate.

The process for legally changing ones sex on legal documents differ depending on the type of document. To change sex marker on a birth certificate, the applicant must show that they have undergone "permanent medical changes".  In the past this has been interpreted as meaning that a transgender person who has not had genital reconstruction surgery cannot change their sex on their birth certificate, but this has since been updated to be a case-by-case assessment, therefore full genital reconstruction surgery may not always be necessary. When the Births, Deaths, Marriages, and Relationships Registration Act 2021 comes into force in 2023, applicants who were born in New Zealand will be able to change the sex marker on their birth certificate by applying to the Registrar of Births, Deaths and Marriages, along with a statutory declaration of their gender identity and paying the prescribed fee. Minors under 18 will also need consent of their legal guardian or a letter of recommendation from a suitable third party (such as, but not limited to, a health professional) that the minor gives informed consent to changing their sex marker.

As of 2013, the process of changing sex on a New Zealand passport has been simplified to lessen the legal barrier faced by transgender passport holders. Applicants need to apply for a new or replacement passport, along with a statutory declaration of their gender identity for the change to occur. If the applicant is under 16, the application also must include a letter of support from a registered counsellor or medical professional. The process is similar in the case of changing sex on a citizenship certificate.

New Zealand driver licences do not have a gender marker printed on them, although the licence holder's gender is recorded on the driver licence register. The gender on the register can be changed when applying for or renewing a driver licence, or by contacting Waka Kotahi NZ Transport Agency.

As of 2016, Statistics New Zealand has the globally first official statistical standard for gender identity, which provides guidance for the collection, analysis and reporting of official statistics on gender identity. The current version of the standard was released in April 2021.

During the 2020 New Zealand general election, Newshub and Stuff reported that documents for individuals who want to register to vote (for the New Zealand 2020 elections) include a checkbox for the gender-neutral title Mx.

Legislation 

During the first reading for the Statutes Amendment Bill (No 4) in April 2014, Louisa Wall submitted a Supplementary Order Paper requesting an amendment of s21(1)(a) of the Human Rights Act 1993 to include gender identity as a prohibited grounds of discrimination. Whilst it has been accepted by the government for several years that transgender people are already protected under the prohibition on sexual discrimination, Louisa Wall argued that the minor change would be a technical one to confirm and clarify this. This move was supported by Jan Logie.

In August 2021, Minister of Justice Kris Faafoi introduced the Conversion Practices Prohibition Legislation Bill to outlaw conversion therapy practices. The Bill passed its first reading and entered into the select committee stage on 5 August. The Bill subsequently passed its third and final reading on 15 February 2022, becoming law.

In November 2017, the New Zealand Parliament introduced the Births, Deaths, Marriages, and Relationships Registration Bill to allow people to change the sex on their birth certificates by statutory declaration, avoiding having to go through the Family Court or show evidence of medical treatment to change their sex. The Human Rights Commission has supported the bill on the grounds that it makes it easier for transgender and non-binary individuals to update sex details on birth certificates. The Bill passed its third reading on 9 December 2021 and received the Royal Assent on 15 December 2021. This law comes into effect in 2023.

Summary table

See also
LGBT rights in New Zealand
 Intersex rights in New Zealand
The Inquiry into Discrimination Experienced by Transgender People
Births, Deaths, Marriages, and Relationships Registration Bill

References

External links
Trans people: facts & information – New Zealand Human Rights Commission
Human Rights Act 1993 – legislation.govt.nz

LGBT rights in New Zealand
Transgender law
New Zealand
New Zealand